David "Bronco" Layne (born Sheffield, 29 July 1939) is an English former footballer most famous for playing for Sheffield Wednesday and his involvement in the British betting scandal of 1964.

Playing career

Rotherham United

Layne started his career playing part-time for Rotherham United in the summer of 1957. He only played eleven matches for the Millers over two seasons, but still managed to score four goals before he was given a free transfer.

Layne's nickname was inspired by a popular American Western TV series, Bronco which was broadcast in the UK just as Layne was establishing his career. The protagonist, Bronco Layne, was played in the series by Ty Hardin.

Swindon Town

He joined Swindon Town. Layne became a prolific goalscorer whilst at Swindon, netting 28 goals in 41 games.

Bradford City

He attracted the attention of Bradford City who paid a club record £6,000 for his signature midway through the 1960–61 season. Layne broke the Bantams' goalscoring record in 1961–62 scoring 34 league goals over the course of the season. His goalscoring prowess was now attracting the attention of bigger clubs and he moved in the summer of 1962. Bradford recouped £22,500 for Layne, setting the record for highest fee received by the club at the time.

Sheffield Wednesday

Layne spent two seasons at Sheffield Wednesday and was the club's top scorer in both with 58 goals in 81 games over the two-year period. Layne's career was however cut short in its prime when he became involved in the British betting scandal of 1964. Layne was found guilty of match fixing and betting against his own team and along with several other players was gaoled and banned from football for life. The ban was lifted eight years later. Layne rejoined Wednesday in 1972 but failed to earn a place on the team.

Hereford United

He was sent on loan to Hereford United. After only four games at the club he retired from league football.

Matlock Town

He joined Matlock Town where he spent the rest of his career before being forced to retire through injury.

After playing

In 2006, it was reported that he was working as a pub landlord in Sheffield.

References

Notes

Sources consulted 

1939 births
Living people
Footballers from Sheffield
English footballers
Rotherham United F.C. players
Swindon Town F.C. players
Bradford City A.F.C. players
Sheffield Wednesday F.C. players
Hereford United F.C. players
Matlock Town F.C. players
Association football forwards
Sportspeople convicted of crimes
Publicans